Edward Meneeley (December 17, 1927 in Wilkes-Barre, Pennsylvania, United States - December 29, 2012 in Weatherly, Pennsylvania) was an American artist who created paintings, sculptures, and prints.

Life
The only child of Edward Sr. and Ludwina Halter, Meneeley joined the Navy shortly after the Japanese invasion of Pearl Harbor. He spent most of World War II as a medic caring for paraplegics in Riverside, California, where he befriended Marlon Brando during the filming of The Men, which took place on his ward. Upon discharge, Meneeley returned to Wilkes-Barre and attended the Murray School of Art and began making frequent trips to New York City. He was then recalled for the Korean War, where he served as a Navy photographer at the Philadelphia Naval Hospital. When released, Meneeley staged two solo exhibitions at the Donovan Gallery in Philadelphia before moving to Manhattan to attend New York's School of Visual Arts on his second installment of the GI Bill.

Work
A three-time recipient of grants from the Pollock-Krasner Foundation, as well as the National Endowment for the Arts and British Arts Council, Meneeley staged his first one-person exhibit in New York in 1962. Prior to making his mark on the arts community as an artist, Meneeley was best known for his archival photographic record of the works of others, first as a staff photographer of Contemporary Slides and later as owner of Portable Gallery Press and ESM Documentations.

His last four decades included several solo and group shows in New York, London, and other major cities including Athens, Edinburgh, Atlanta, and Wilmington, North Carolina.

Meneeley cut his teeth in the world of abstract expressionism and the New York School beginning in his early adulthood in the 1950s. It was then when he was flavored by rapport with the likes of Franz Kline and Frank O'Hara through their artistic exchanges at the legendary Cedar Tavern and the Artists' Club.

He visited the studios and became friends with Willem de Kooning, Helen Frankenthaler, Hans Hofmann, Jasper Johns, Robert Motherwell, Robert Rauschenberg, Theodoros Stamos, and Andy Warhol, among others.

His first hand experience with the New York School was furthered by his serving as archival photographer for major exhibits at the Museum of Modern Art under the supervision of Alfred Barr and Dorothy Miller, as well as major shows at such cutting edge galleries as Leo Castelli, Andre Emmerich, Alan Stone, Eleanor Ward, Betty Parsons, and Martha Jackson.

In 2010, he was given a solo exhibition within the Cathedral of Saint John the Divine, New York.

Meneeley died on December 29, 2012, at the age of 85.

References
 Castelman, Riva. "Printed Art: A View of Two Decades" Museum of Modern Art Catalog
 Endick, Kenneth. (November 28, 1997) "Exhibit of this Master Artist Belies His Age" The Express-Times
 Fallon, Brian. (November 24, 1976) "Ed Meneeeley at Dowling Street" The Irish Times
 Glueck, Grace. (November 21, 1965) "Instant Art" New York Times
 Heyer, Marigrace. (May 26, 2005) "Art Show Features Noted Local" Times News
 Kenedy, R.C. (October 1971) Art International
 Melville, Robert. (September 3, 1971) "Jelly Babies" New Statesman
 Morgan, Roy. (October 18, 1989) "Misericordia Boasts a Striking Art Show" The Times Leader
 Outwater, Myra. (October 9, 1999) "Meneeley Show an Intriguing Testament to Travels, Friends, and Experiences" The Morning Call
 Thomas, Robert. (April 1971) Art and Artists
 Wolff, Theodore. (November 24, 1981) "The Many Masks of Modern Art" The Christian Science Monitor
 Wolff, Theodore. (February 10, 1982) "Fine Edward Meneeley Show" The Christian Science Monitor

Notes

External links
 www.edwardmeneeley.com
Obituary - 

20th-century American painters
American male painters
21st-century American painters
21st-century American male artists
1927 births
2012 deaths
People from Wilkes-Barre, Pennsylvania
20th-century American sculptors
20th-century American male artists
American male sculptors
20th-century American printmakers